Shabbash Daddy is a 1979 Bollywood film directed, produced, written & starred by Kishore Kumar, also stars Yogeeta Bali, Amit Kumar, Jaya Sudha in lead roles. The film was one of several collaborations between Kishore Kumar and his real-life son Amit, where the two played a father and son. The film did not get notice.

Cast
Kishore Kumar as Chhaju Singh
Yogeeta Bali   
Amit Kumar   
Jaya Sudha
Madan Puri
Mehmood

Production
According to Rohit Mahajan from The Tribune, Kishore Kumar directed this film partly to launch his son in the movie industry.

Reception
Diptakirti Chaudhuri described the film as "zanily named, crazily plotted". Derek Bose described Kishore Kumar as "rather restrained as a retired army officer, Col Chhaju Singh who flips over a beautiful fisherwoman, even as he has a young  eligible son at home".

References

External links
 

1979 films
1970s Hindi-language films